Samuel Marsh was an English professional footballer who played in the Football League for Bolton Wanderers as a forward. A long-serving player for the club, he scored 81 goals in 201 appearances.

Football career
After playing his youth football with Daisy Hill and Hindley, he joined Atherton Church House before signing as a professional for Bolton Wanderers in 1902.

He was the top scorer in the Football League Second Division during the 1904–05 season, with 27 goals. At the end of the 1911–12 season, he switched to Bury. In his ten years with Bolton, Marsh made a total of 201 first-team appearances, scoring 81 goals.

After only one season at Bury, in which he played three league matches, Marsh retired.

References

1879 births
Year of death missing
People from Westhoughton
English footballers
Association football forwards
English Football League players
Atherton F.C. players
Bolton Wanderers F.C. players
Bury F.C. players
FA Cup Final players